In the Gloaming is a 1997 American television film written by Will Scheffer and directed by Christopher Reeve in his directorial debut. It stars Robert Sean Leonard, Glenn Close, David Strathairn, Bridget Fonda and Whoopi Goldberg. The movie is based on a short story in The New Yorker written by Alice Elliott Dark. The film premiered on HBO on April 20, 1997. It won four CableACE Awards and was nominated for five Primetime Emmy Awards.

Premise
Prodigal son Danny leaves San Francisco and returns to his family’s home to die from late-stage AIDS. Danny finds the same icy-cool, upper-crust suburban home he left all those years ago. Danny’s father is a middle-age businessman who's clueless as to how to relate to his son, and has never come to terms with his son's homosexuality. His sister Anne feels left out of the moments of closeness Danny shares with their mother. His mother Janet feels guilty for keeping her son at a distance, but it's her that he emotionally connects with and ultimately ends up facing his death with, by sharing their thoughts on everything from movies to sex. Live-in nurse Myrna completes the picture.

Cast
 Robert Sean Leonard as Danny
 Glenn Close as Janet
 David Strathairn as Martin
 Bridget Fonda as Anne
 Whoopi Goldberg as Nurse Myrna
 Annie Starke as Young Anne
 Will Reeve as Young Danny (son of Christopher Reeve)

Production notes
Christopher Reeve had to direct most of the film from a room off set via TV monitors and headphones because the hissing sounds from his respirator would have ruined the actors' voice recordings. He would watch and listen to all the day’s scenes from the room, and when he had instructions to give, he used a microphone to convey those directives to a speaker situated next to the actors. Robert Sean Leonard said of Reeve, "to have someone on your set who cannot move, but who's in charge, is a rather incredible thing. Most first-time directors have a hard time with the chaos that goes on. [They tend to] put lots of the decisions on the cinematographer's shoulders. Not Chris. He held his own … He was the anchor."

Critical reception
Variety wrote in their review that "Close is strikingly passionate, while Leonard is superb in capturing the complex layers of Danny’s ever-evolving emotional state...the movie is rare in its utter lack of contrived sentiment, even when Danny’s near death". The Chicago Tribune wrote "it's an exceptionally powerful work...and Leonard conveys a deep sense of release and clarity of vision, while Close shines as a woman whose tragedy forces her to revisit the paths taken in her life".

New York Times TV critic John J. O'Connor wrote that "Reeve makes an enormously impressive directorial debut". O'Connor also suggested that this is really a chamber piece, a duet for mother and son. "In this instance, both are extraordinary. Ms. Close...reminds us once again that she can be the most subtle and moving of actresses...and Mr. Leonard skillfully avoids easy sentimentality to create an admirably steel-edged portrait". The Hartford Courant wrote "the film belongs mostly to Close and Leonard, whose complicated, sometimes uncomfortably close relationship, drives the story". They also advised that the film is an hour well worth investing in, "an often deeply moving portrayal of an American family that too many, no doubt, know too well".

Awards and nominations

|-
! scope="row" rowspan="5"| 1997
| In The Gloaming
| Primetime Emmy Award for Outstanding Television Movie
| 
|-
| Christopher Reeve
| Primetime Emmy Award for Outstanding Directing for a Limited Series, Movie, or Dramatic Special
| 
|-
| Glenn Close
| Primetime Emmy Award for Outstanding Lead Actress in a Limited Series or Movie
| 
|-
| Bridget Fonda
| Primetime Emmy Award for Outstanding Supporting Actress in a Limited Series or Movie
| 
|-
|Fred Elmes
| Primetime Emmy Award for Outstanding Cinematography for a Limited Series or Movie
| 
|-
! scope="row" rowspan="4"| 1997
| In The Gloaming
| CableACE Award for Dramatic or Theatrical Special
| 
|-
| Glenn Close
| CableACE Award for Guest Actress in a Dramatic Special or Series
| 
|-
| Will Scheffer
| CableACE Award for Writing a Dramatic Special or Series
| 
|-
| Dave Grusin
| CableACE Award for Original Score
| 
|-

References

External links

 

1997 films
1997 television films
1997 drama films
1997 LGBT-related films
American LGBT-related television films
Films directed by Christopher Reeve
Films scored by Dave Grusin
HBO Films films
HIV/AIDS in American films
LGBT-related drama films
1997 directorial debut films
American drama television films
1990s English-language films
1990s American films